Ryken is a surname. Notable people with the surname include:

Leland Ryken, American literary scholar
Philip Ryken, American college president, son of Leland
Theodore James Ryken (1797–1871), Dutch founder of the religious order Xaverian Brothers

See also 

 St. Mary's Ryken High School, named after Theodore James Ryken
 Paul Rykens (1888–1965), Dutch businessman, founder of Unilever
 Rijken and Rijkens, Dutch surnames
 Riken, Japanese research institute
 Rykener, English surname